Vestenanova is a comune (municipality) in the Province of Verona in the Italian region Veneto, located about  west of Venice and about  northeast of Verona.

Vestenanova borders the following municipalities: Altissimo, Badia Calavena, Chiampo, Crespadoro, San Giovanni Ilarione, San Pietro Mussolino, Selva di Progno, and Tregnago.

Twin towns
Vestenanova is twinned with:

  Eichstätt, Germany

References

External links
 Official website

Cities and towns in Veneto